Ab Fafié (4 March 1941 – 27 November 2012) was a Dutch professional football player and manager.

Playing career

Club
Fafié made his debut for hometown club Feijenoord against Fortuna '54 in 1959 and also played for Rotterdam club Xerxes as well as for PSV. During an injury-hit spell he only played 13 games for the Eindhovenaren.

Managerial career
Fafié became assistant to Feyenoord manager Hans Kraay in 1981 and was named caretaker after Kraay's dismissal in 1983. He took charge in 1984 after Thijs Libregts was sacked and ended up third in the Eredivisie in both his seasons at the helm. He later managed a number of teams throughout Europe, including AEK Athens, AA Gent, FC Utrecht and Go Ahead Eagles where he had succeeded the dismissed Henk Ten Cate.

FC Utrecht
At Utrecht, he earned the nickname King Ab after steering them to European football with a fourth-placed finish in his first season. The club crashed out of next year's UEFA Cup to Spanish giants Real Madrid and after some less successful seasons, Fafié was given the sack in 1994.

He also had spells in charge at two Indonesian clubs and coached the final years of his life at amateur sides CVV, Overmaas, WSE and NBSVV.

Personal life
Fafié died in November 2012, aged 71.

References

1941 births
2012 deaths
Footballers from Rotterdam
Association football fullbacks
Dutch footballers
Feyenoord players
XerxesDZB players
PSV Eindhoven players
Eredivisie players
Dutch football managers
Feyenoord managers
AEK Athens F.C. managers
PAS Giannina F.C. managers
K.A.A. Gent managers
FC Utrecht managers
AEK Larnaca FC managers
Go Ahead Eagles managers
Persija Jakarta managers
Eredivisie managers
Dutch expatriate football managers
Expatriate football managers in Greece
Expatriate football managers in Belgium
Expatriate football managers in Cyprus
Expatriate football managers in Indonesia
Dutch expatriate sportspeople in Greece
Dutch expatriate sportspeople in Belgium
Dutch expatriate sportspeople in Cyprus
Dutch expatriates in Indonesia